Seneca Township is one of the eighteen townships of Monroe County, Ohio, United States. As of the 2010 census, the population was 486.

Geography
Located in the northwestern corner of the county, it borders the following townships:
Beaver Township, Noble County - north
Somerset Township, Belmont County - northeast
Malaga Township - east
Summit Township - southeast
Franklin Township - south
Stock Township, Noble County - southwest corner
Marion Township, Noble County - west

No municipalities are located in Seneca Township.

Name and history
Statewide, other Seneca Townships are located in Noble and Seneca counties.

Government
The township is governed by a three-member board of trustees, who are elected in November of odd-numbered years to a four-year term beginning on the following January 1. Two are elected in the year after the presidential election and one is elected in the year before it. There is also an elected township fiscal officer, who serves a four-year term beginning on April 1 of the year after the election, which is held in November of the year before the presidential election. Vacancies in the fiscal officership or on the board of trustees are filled by the remaining trustees.

References

External links
County website

Townships in Monroe County, Ohio
Townships in Ohio